Oesho is a deity found on coins of 2nd to 6th-century, particularly the 2nd-century Kushan era. He was apparently one of the titular deities of the Kushan dynasty. Oesho is an early Kushan deity that is regarded as an amalgamation of Shiva. 

By the time of the Kushan emperor Ooishki (Bactrian Οοηϸκι; often Romanised as Huvishka), who reigned in 140–180 CE, Oesho and the female deity Ardoksho (Ardoxsho; Ardochsho; Ardokhsho) were the only deities appearing on Kushan coins.

Connections
Connections to several contemporaneous deities worshipped by neighbouring cultures have been suggested.
 During the Kushan era, Oesho was often linked to the Hindu concept of Ishvara, which was embodied by the god Shiva; Oesho may share the same etymology as Ishvara and/or represent a variant of the word in the Bactrian language spoken by the Kushans.
 Similarities have retrospectively been identified with the Avestan Vayu.
 Some later representations, evidently influenced by Greco-Bactrian culture, depict Oesho with a trishula, the traditional implement of Shiva, similar to a trident that is part of Poseidon’s iconography.

Consort
The consort of Oesho was Ommo ("ΟΜΜΟ", Umā), as shown on a coin type of Kushan ruler Huvishka with, on the reverse, the divine couple Ommo ("ΟΜΜΟ", Umā) holding a flower, and Oesho ("ΟΗϷΟ", Shiva) with four arms holding attributes.

Depictions of Oesho

Notes

References 
 

South Asian deities
Kushan Empire
Forms of Shiva